Carey Lake Wildlife Management Area at  is an Idaho wildlife management area in Blaine County near the town of Carey. The first land acquisition for the WMA occurred in 1949 from the Carey Lake Reservoir Company to provide habitat for migrating and breeding waterfowl and shorebirds. 

The WMA is at the edge of lava field that includes Craters of the Moon National Monument to the east. Mule deer are the most common large mammal, and the most common recreational activity is fishing, particularly for largemouth bass and bluegill.

References

Protected areas established in 1949
Protected areas of Blaine County, Idaho
Wildlife management areas of Idaho
1949 establishments in Idaho